Brooklyn Ilunga (born 21 November 2003) is an English professional footballer who plays as a wing-back for National League club Wealdstone, on loan from  club Milton Keynes Dons.

Club career

Milton Keynes Dons
Ilunga joined Milton Keynes Dons at the age of 7 and progressed through the club's academy before signing scholarship terms in August 2020. After featuring for the first team as a substitute on the final day of the 2020–21 season, Ilunga was handed the squad number 25 ahead of the 2021–22 campaign.

He signed professional terms in October 2021, the same month in which he made his first professional start, in a 2–1 home EFL Trophy group stage win over Wycombe Wanderers on 5 October 2021. On 22 February 2022, Ilunga joined Southern League Premier Central club Royston Town on loan for the remainder of the season. He concluded his debut year as a professional by being named MK Dons' Academy Player of the Year for the 2021–22 season. 

On 1 September 2022, Ilunga joined National League South club Hemel Hempstead Town until January 2023. On 6 January 2023, Ilunga joined National League club Wealdstone on loan until the end of the season.

Career statistics

Honours
Royston Town
 Southern League Challenge Cup: 2021–22

Individual
Milton Keynes Dons Academy Player of the Year: 2021–22

References

External links

Living people
2003 births
English footballers
Association football defenders
English Football League players
Southern Football League players
National League (English football) players
Milton Keynes Dons F.C. players
Royston Town F.C. players
Hemel Hempstead Town F.C. players
Wealdstone F.C. players
Black British sportspeople